The Southwest Neighborhood Library is a branch of the District of Columbia Public Library in the Southwest Waterfront neighborhood of Washington, D.C. It is located at 900 Wesley Place SW.

History 

The library first opened in 1941 inside Thomas Jefferson Memorial Junior High School, a Georgian Revival-style building designed by architect Nathan C. Wyeth. A new library building opened in 1965 and closed in June 2019, with a new $18 million building to be constructed in its place.  During construction, interim library service was provided at 425 M Street SW.The new 20,000-square-foot building, which opened in May 2021, was designed by Perkins and Will and built by Turner Construction. Built primarily out of mass timber and glass, it was produced in pieces in Vancouver and shipped to Washington, where it was assembled.
Though it is one floor shorter than the old building, the new library was designed with a focus on community space. It includes a large meeting room, three conference rooms, and four study rooms, as well as an outdoor porch. New technology incorporated in the rebuilt library includes an innovation lab with 3-D printers, as well as solar panels that provide for half of the building's energy needs. The D.C. Department of Parks and Recreation also collaborated with the library to improve the playground adjacent to the building.

References

External links 
 Official website

Public libraries in Washington, D.C.